Miroslav Kostelka (born 31 January 1951) is a Czech diplomat and politician.

Career
He served as the Ambassador Extraordinary and Plenipotentiary of the Czech Republic to the Russian Federation in 2005–2009. In 2003–2004 he served in the cabinet of Vladimír Špidla as a Minister of Defence.

See also
List of Ambassadors of the Czech Republic to Russia

References

Living people
Ambassadors of the Czech Republic to Russia
1951 births
Defence ministers of the Czech Republic
Czech Social Democratic Party Government ministers
People from Františkovy Lázně